Autosomal dominant intellectual disability-craniofacial anomalies-cardiac defects syndrome is a rare genetic disorder which is characterized by multi-systemic symptoms primarily affecting the intellect and  post-natal development.

Signs and symptoms 

Symptoms within people with the disorder vary, but they are generally the following:

Intellectual 
 Intellectual disabilities

Developmental 
 Widespread developmental delays
 Speech delays (which can sometimes last into adulthood)
 Feeding difficulties

Intestinal 
 Acid reflux
 Chronic constipation

Cardiac 
 Atrial septal defect
 Ventricular septal defect
 Patent foramen ovale
 Persistent ductus arteriosus

Ocular 
 Strabismus
 Amblyopia
 Refractory errors

Facial 
 Broad nose
 Thin upper lip
 Bitemporal narrowing
 Microcephaly

Less common symptoms include craniosynostosis, autism, sleep disturbance, epilepsy, recurrent viral infections.

Complications 

Children with the disorder can often have various complications if the disorder goes unnoticed and untreated, for example, the cardiac defects can result in health problems and often, death, the behavioural problems can lead to an unstable (if it is existing) social life, low self esteem, and depression, the ocular problems can result in visual impairment, etc.

Causes 

This condition is caused by heterozygous mutations in the KAT6A gene, in chromosome 8. These mutations are often sporadic, and are either frameshift, missense, and nonsense.

Diagnosis
Diagnosis of the disorder is established by gene sequencing.

Treatment 

Treatment is done on the symptoms the condition causes, a few examples would include therapy sessions for the behavioral problems, corrective surgery for the cardiac defects, etc.

Epidemiology 

According to OMIM, 78 cases have been described in medical literature.

References 

Syndromes with intellectual disability
Syndromes affecting the eye
Rare genetic syndromes
Autosomal dominant disorders